A redox titration  is a type of titration based on a redox reaction between the analyte and titrant. It may involve the use of a redox indicator and/or a potentiometer. A common example of a redox titration is treating a solution of iodine with a reducing agent to produce iodide using a starch indicator to help detect the endpoint. Iodine (I2) can be reduced to iodide (I−) by, say,  thiosulfate (and when all iodine is spent the blue colour disappears. This is called an iodometric titration.

Most often of all, the reduction of iodine to iodide is the last step in a series of reactions where the initial reactions are used to convert an unknown amount of the solute (the substance being analyzed) to an equivalent amount of iodine, which may then be titrated. Sometimes other halogens (or haloalkanes) than iodine are used in the intermediate reactions because they are available in better measurable standard solutions and/or react more readily with the solute. The extra steps in iodometric titration may be worthwhile because the equivalence point, where the blue turns a bit colourless, is more distinct than some other analytical or may be by  volumetric methods.

The main redox titration types are:

{| class="wikitable"
|-
! Redox titration !! Titrant
|-
| Iodometry || Iodine (I2)
|-
| Bromatometry || Bromine (Br2)
|-
| Cerimetry || Cerium(IV) salts
|-
| Permanganometry || Potassium permanganate
|-
| Dichrometry || Potassium dichromate
|-hzhsisi
|}

Sources

See also
Oxidizing agent
Reducing agent

Titration